Brian Barnes may refer to:

Brian Barnes (artist) (1944–2021), English artist
Brian Barnes (baseball) (born 1967), American baseball player
Brian Barnes (golfer) (1945–2019), Scottish golfer
Brian Barnes (swimmer) (born 1934), British swimmer
Brian James Barnes (1933–2017), Roman Catholic archbishop